Szeremeta is a Polish-language surname.
Kamil Szeremeta (born 1989), Polish boxer
Nic Szeremeta (born 1943), Polish poker player
Ryszard Szeremeta (born 1952), Polish composer and singer

See also
Šeremet
Seremet
Sheremet (disambiguation)

Polish-language surnames

ru:Шеремета